Cirilo Marmolejo (1890, Teocaltiche, México - 1960, México) was a folk musician of  guitarrón and vihuela, and pioneer in the development of the mariachi band. By the year 1918, he was invited to play at Guadalajara city, and then at Mexico city. From that time,  the popularization of this type of band spread in the country. The Mariachi Coculense of Marmolejo was the first mariachi to tour and record in the United States, and to add a trumpet to the ensemble.

References
Jáuregui, Jesús. (2007). El Mariachi. Símbolo musical de México. Taurus.  .

Mexican musicians
Mexican-guitarron players
Players of the Mexican vihuela
1960 deaths
1890 births